Paul Pike is a Canadian politician, who was elected to the Newfoundland and Labrador House of Assembly in the 2021 provincial election. He represents the electoral district of Burin-Grand Bank as a member of the Liberal Party of Newfoundland and Labrador.

Prior to entering provincial politics, Pike was a teacher and the mayor of St. Lawrence.

Election results

References

Living people
Liberal Party of Newfoundland and Labrador MHAs
21st-century Canadian politicians
Year of birth missing (living people)
Mayors of places in Newfoundland and Labrador